Myurella affinis is a species of sea snail, a marine gastropod mollusk in the family Terebridae, the auger snails.

Description

Distribution

References

 Bratcher, T., 1977. Deshayes' terebrid types in Ecole des Mines, Paris. The Nautilus 91(2): 39–42
 Terryn Y. (2007). Terebridae: A Collectors Guide. Conchbooks & Natural Art. 59 pp + plates.
 Severns, M. (2011). Shells of the Hawaiian Islands – The Sea Shells. Conchbooks, Hackenheim. 564 pp

External links
 Gray, J. E. (1834). Enumeration of the species of Terebra, with characters of many hitherto undescribed. Proceedings of the Zoological Society of London. (1834) 2: 59–63
 Deshayes, G. P. (1859). A general review of the genus Terebra, and a description of new species. Proceedings of the Zoological Society of London. (1859) 27: 270–321
 Quoy J.R.C. & Gaimard J.P. (1832–1835). Voyage de découvertes de l'"Astrolabe" exécuté par ordre du Roi, pendant les années 1826–1829, sous le commandement de M. J. Dumont d'Urville. Zoologie.
 Fedosov, A. E.; Malcolm, G.; Terryn, Y.; Gorson, J.; Modica, M. V.; Holford, M.; Puillandre, N. (2020). Phylogenetic classification of the family Terebridae (Neogastropoda: Conoidea). Journal of Molluscan Studies. 85(4): 359–388

Terebridae
Gastropods described in 1834